The Origins of Lonergan's Notion of the Dialectic of History: A Study of Lonergan's Early Writings on History is a 1993 book by Michael Shute, in which the author provides "a study of previously unavailable material from the 1930s on the subject of history by Bernard Lonergan".

References

External links
The Origins of Lonergan's Notion of the Dialectic of History: A Study of Lonergan's Early Writings on History

1993 non-fiction books
University Press of America books
Works about Bernard Lonergan
Books about the philosophy of history